Brita Bigum (a.k.a. Britta Bigum and Brita Bigum Grønn, January 15, 1921 – October 12, 1980) was a Norwegian actress.

Career
Bigum made her stage debut as a child in the play Per og Kari reiser til månen at the National Theatre in Oslo. She later danced at Chat Noir and the Edderkoppen Theater. Bigum made her film debut in 1940 in Tancred Ibsen's Tørres Snørtevold and appeared in a total of eight films between 1940 and 1957. She appeared as Hannchen in Eduard Künneke's operetta The Cousin from Nowhere (Norwegian title: Fetteren fra Batavia) at the Norwegian National Opera and Ballet during the 1951/52 season, and she was also active at the New Theater in 1953.

Filmography
1940: Tørres Snørtevold as the third sales clerk
1946: Et spøkelse forelsker seg as Grynet
1949: Vi flyr på Rio as the English-speaking cabaret singer
1950: Døden er et kjærtegn as Brita
1951: Kranes konditori as Mrs. Berg
1951: Skadeskutt as Liv, a nurse
1952: Trine! as Miss Svingvoll
1957: Fjols til fjells as Mrs. Rosenkrantz

References

External links
 
 Brita Bigum at the Swedish Film Database
 Brita Bigum at the National Theater
 Brita Bigum at Filmfront
 Brita Bigum at Sceneweb

1921 births
1980 deaths
20th-century Norwegian actresses
Actresses from Oslo